Freeman Township is a township in Clay County, Iowa, USA.  As of the 2000 census, its population was 444.

History
Freeman Township was created in 1882.

Geography
According to the USGS, it contains one cemetery, Dickens.

The stream of Pickerel Run runs through this township. Also located in the township is Barringer Slough.

Notes

References
 USGS Geographic Names Information System (GNIS)

External links
 US-Counties.com
 City-Data.com

Townships in Clay County, Iowa
Townships in Iowa